Blerim Mula (born 21 October 1958) is a football manager and former defender who played for clubs in the former Yugoslavia and Turkey.

Playing career
Born in Gjakova, Mula began playing football for local side FK Vlaznimi. He played one season in the Yugoslav Second League during his tenure with the club.

In 1987, Mula moved to Turkey where he would spend the remainder of his playing career. He first joined Turkish Süper Lig side Sakaryaspor, where he would win the 1987–88 Turkish Cup. Four seasons later, he moved to rivals Konyaspor for one season. After a few seasons playing in the second and third divisions, Mula retired from football at the end of the 1997–98 season.

Managerial career
After retiring from playing football, Mula became a coach. He was appointed manager of KF Vëllaznimi on multiple occasions.

References

External links
 
 
 Profile at Turksports.net

1958 births
Living people
Sportspeople from Gjakova
Association football defenders
Yugoslav footballers
Kosovan footballers
KF Vëllaznimi players
Sakaryaspor footballers
Konyaspor footballers
Kosovan expatriate footballers
Expatriate footballers in Turkey
Kosovan expatriate sportspeople in Turkey
Kosovan football managers
KF Vëllaznimi managers